Sočkovac is a village located in Petrovo municipality, northern Bosnia and Herzegovina. It is geographically located in the Bosnia region and it politically belongs to Republika Srpska.

History
Sočkovac historically belongs to Gračanica municipality. After the war Gračanica was divided and belongs to the Federation of Bosnia and Herzegovina, the rest of pre-war municipality belongs to Republika Srpska, and Bosansko Petrovo Selo, a settlement in the past belonged to Gračanica, became the new administration centre.

References
1991 BiH census

Villages in Republika Srpska
Populated places in Petrovo, Bosnia and Herzegovina